Jointed goatgrass may refer to:
 Aegilops cylindrica
 Aegilops triuncialis